Anne Fishbein (born 1958) is an American photographer. Fishbein was born in Chicago, Illinois.

Her work is included in the collections of the Art Institute of Chicago, the San Francisco Museum of Modern Art and the National Gallery of Canada.

References

External links
 Anne Fishbein's website

20th-century American photographers
21st-century American photographers
Artists from Chicago
1958 births
Living people
20th-century American women photographers
21st-century American women photographers